Dimitrescu is a Romanian surname that may refer to:
 Constantin Dimitrescu (1847–1928), Romanian classical composer and music teacher
 Constantin Dimitrescu-Iași (1849–1923), philosopher and sociologist
 Ștefan Dimitrescu (1886–1933), Romanian painter and draftsman

Fictional characters
 Alcina Dimitrescu, a character in the video game Resident Evil Village

See also
 Demetrescu
 Dumitrescu

Romanian-language surnames
Patronymic surnames
Surnames from given names